This is a list of Norwegian television related events from 1964.

Events
15 February - Arne Bendiksen is selected to represent Norway at the 1964 Eurovision Song Contest with his song "Spiral". He is selected to be the fifth Norwegian Eurovision entry during Norsk Melodi Grand Prix held at NRK Studios in Oslo.

Debuts

Television shows

Ending this year

Births

Deaths